Lieutenant-General Robert William Lowry  (20 March 1824 – 8 June 1905) was a British Army officer who became colonel of the Royal Berkshire Regiment (Princess Charlotte of Wales's).

Military career
Educated in Dungannon and Belfast, Lowry was commissioned into the 47th (Lancashire) Regiment of Foot and served with his regiment in the Crimean War in Winter 1854 and then in Malta in January 1857. He commanded field forces in the Fenian raids in 1866. He became colonel of the Royal Berkshire Regiment (Princess Charlotte of Wales's) in 1894 and died in 1905.

References

People of the Fenian raids
British Army personnel of the Crimean War
Military personnel from County Tyrone
British Army lieutenant generals
1905 deaths
Royal Berkshire Regiment officers
Companions of the Order of the Bath
1824 births